Universal United House of Prayer is Buddy Miller's fifth solo album, and his first for New West Records. The album appeared for one week and reached No. 64 on the Billboard Top Country Albums chart. It received the 2004 Americana Music Award for Album of the Year for 2004, and contains the Mark Heard-penned song "Worry Too Much", which won the award for Song of the Year that same year.

Track listing

References

 

2004 albums
Buddy Miller albums